The FC Basel 1923–24 season was their thirty first season since the club's foundation on 15 November 1893. The club's chairman was Karl Ibach. It was his second season as chairman in his second period as chairman. FC Basel played their home games in the Landhof in the district Wettstein in Kleinbasel.

Overview 
The ex-German international Max Breunig was the first team trainer for the second successive season.

Basel played a total of 30 matches in this season. 16 of these were in the domestic league and 14 were friendly matches. Of these 14 friendlies, three were home games played in the Landhof and 11 were away games. Seven test games ended in a victory and seven ended in a defeat. In these tests Basel scored a total of 39 goals and conceded 35. Of these friendlies, six were during the pre-season, and one was a mid-season. Because the domestic league had no real winter break the other seven were played after group stage had been completed.

There were a few modifications to the Swiss football league system, this season the number of clubs was increased from 24 to 27 teams. Again, the league was again divided into three regional groups, East, Central and West, now each group with nine teams. The last team in each group had to play a barrage against relegation. FC Basel were allocated to the Central group and now there were four teams from the city of Basel. The others being Concordia Basel, who were newly promoted, Nordstern Basel and Old Boys Basel. The further teams allocated to this group were Young Boys Bern, FC Bern, Aarau, Luzern and Biel-Bienne. 

Basel started their season unfavourably, losing four of the first five games. Despite improving during the rest of the season, they could not close the gap to the leading two teams and they finished the group in third position with 18 points, seven points behind Young Boys and eight behind local rivals Nordstern who won the group and continued to the finals. East group winners Zürich won the championship, Nordstern were runners-up and West group winners Servette were third. Basel won eight of their matches, drawing two and suffered six defeats. Basel scored 16 goals and conceded 15.

Therefore, the problem seems to be because of their strikers, because the team scored just 16 goals in 16 matches. Otto Kuhn was the team’s top league goal scorer in the league season with just four goals. Alfred Schlecht scored three, Heinrich Hess, Karl Putzendopler and Karl Wüthrich each scored two goals and Arthur Fahr scored one. The other two goal scorers were not recorded.

Players 
Squad members

Results 

Legend

Friendly matches

Pre-season and mid-season

End of season

Serie A

Central Group results

Central Group table

See also
 History of FC Basel
 List of FC Basel players
 List of FC Basel seasons

References

Sources 
 Rotblau: Jahrbuch Saison 2014/2015. Publisher: FC Basel Marketing AG. 
 Die ersten 125 Jahre. Publisher: Josef Zindel im Friedrich Reinhardt Verlag, Basel. 
 FCB team 1923–24 at fcb-archiv.ch
 Switzerland 1923-24 at RSSSF

External links
 FC Basel official site

FC Basel seasons
Basel